"I'll Still Be Loving You" is a song recorded by American country music group Restless Heart. It was released in January 1987 as the second single from the album Wheels. The song was written by Todd Cerney, Pam Rose, Mary Ann Kennedy and Pat Bunch, and was Restless Heart's second number-one country single. It went to number 1 on Hot Country Songs for one week and spent 25 weeks on the chart.

The single also was a hit on the Adult Contemporary chart and gave the band their first exposure on the pop charts, where it became their first top 40 single. It was the first country song to cross over to the Hot 100 list since "Bop" by Dan Seals 18 months earlier, and the first to cross over to the top 40 since "What About Me" by Kenny Rogers (with Kim Carnes and James Ingram) two and a half years earlier. It was the last country song to cross over to the Billboard Hot 100 until Billy Ray Cyrus' "Achy Breaky Heart" five years later in 1992.

Charts

Weekly charts

Year-end charts

References

1987 singles
1986 songs
Restless Heart songs
Songs written by Pam Rose
Songs written by Mary Ann Kennedy (American singer)
Song recordings produced by Scott Hendricks
Songs written by Pat Bunch
Songs written by Todd Cerney
RCA Records singles
Country ballads
1980s ballads